Natalia Aleksandrovna Zabiiako (born 15 August 1994) is a Russian-Estonian competitive pair skater. Competing for Russia with Alexander Enbert, she was the 2019 World bronze medalist, 2018 European bronze medalist, 2018 Grand Prix of Helsinki champion, 2018 NHK Trophy champion, 2016 Rostelecom Cup silver medalist, and three-time Russian national medalist.

Zabiiako competed for Estonia until 2014, partnered with Sergei Muhhin, Sergei Kulbach, and Alexandr Zaboev. With Zaboev, she placed tenth at the 2014 European Championships. Although they qualified a spot for Estonia in the pairs' event at the 2014 Winter Olympics, they did not compete in Sochi because Zaboev's fast-track citizenship application was declined.

Personal life
Zabiiako was born in Tallinn, Estonia. Her mother is an Estonian citizen, and her father holds an Estonian alien's passport.

From 2010 to 2014, Zabiiako lived in the United States with a Russian emigrant family. In April 2014, she said she planned to move to Moscow and apply for Russian citizenship. She became a Russian citizen on 19 December 2014.

Zabiiako entered into a relationship with Russian tennis player Daria Kasatkina.
It became public after Kasatkina posted a photo with her girlfriend on Instagram. Zabiiako also shared several photos with Kasatkina on her Instagram profile.

Career for Estonia
Zabiiako began skating when she was four years old. At age 15, she switched from singles to pairs, partnering with Sergei Muhhin. They made their international debut at the 2009 ISU Junior Grand Prix in Belarus and placed sixteenth at the 2010 World Junior Championships.

Partnership with Kulbach
Later in 2010, Zabiiako teamed up with Ukrainian skater Sergei Kulbach to represent Estonia. After debuting at the 2010 Nebelhorn Trophy, the pair placed thirteenth at the 2011 European Championships and sixteenth at the 2011 World Championships. Zabiiako injured her back as a result of a fall at the NRW Trophy in December 2011, preventing them from competing at the 2012 European Championships. On 15 February 2012, it was reported that Zabiiako and Kulbach had parted ways.

Partnership with Zaboev
In October 2012, Zabiiako teamed up with Russian-born skater Alexandr Zaboev to compete for Estonia. By finishing ninth at the 2013 Nebelhorn Trophy, they earned a spot for Estonia in pair skating at the 2014 Winter Olympics in Sochi. Zaboev applied for Estonian citizenship, required to represent the country at the Olympics, but in November 2013, Estonia denied his fast-track application. Zabiiako/Zaboev placed tenth at the 2014 European Championships and nineteenth at the 2014 World Championships. In late March 2014, Zabiiako ended their partnership, saying he was too difficult to work with and the Estonian Skating Federation did not provide them with equal financial support. In early April 2014, the Secretary General of the Estonian Skating Union submitted an official rebuttal to Zabiiako's statements. The Secretary General called Zabiiako's statements concerning the Skating Union and her partner slanderous and untrue; "Sport - is voluntary, and each person has a right to make decisions, but to justify their actions do not have to lie and defame their partners."

Move to Russia
In April 2014, Zabiiako said she would move to Moscow to work with Nina Mozer and try out with different skaters, intending to compete for Russia. ISU rules require skaters to sit out a certain period of time after a country change.

In Summer 2014, Zabiiako and Yuri Larionov decided to skate together. In June 2015, she said that their partnership had ended.

2015–16 season: Beginning of partnership with Enbert
In July 2015, the Russian media reported that Zabiiako had teamed up with Alexander Enbert and that she had been released to represent Russia internationally.

Zabiiako/Enbert's international debut came in October 2015 at the 2015 Mordovian Ornament, a Challenger Series (CS) event at which they won a silver medal. In November, the pair appeared for the first time on the Grand Prix series, placing fifth at the 2015 Rostelecom Cup. In early December, they finished fourth at the 2015 CS Golden Spin of Zagreb and third in the CS standings. At the 2016 Russian Championships, the pair placed fifth in both segments and overall.

2016–17 season 
Zabiiako/Enbert started the 2016–17 season on the Challenger Series, obtaining the bronze medal at the 2016 CS Ondrej Nepela Memorial. Turning to the Grand Prix series, the pair won the silver medal at the 2016 Rostelecom Cup, having placed first in the short and second in the free behind Germany's Aliona Savchenko / Bruno Massot. They then placed fourth at the 2016 Trophée de France. These results didn't qualify them to the 2016–17 Grand Prix Final but they were the 1st alternates and were called up after Aliona Savchenko / Bruno Massot withdrew. Zabiiako/Enbert placed fourth at the 2016–17 Grand Prix Final after placing fifth in both the short program and the free skate.

In December 2016, Zabiiako/Enbert won the bronze medal at the 2017 Russian Championships after placing third in both the short program and the free skate. In January 2017 they competed at the 2017 European Championships where finished fifth after placing fifth in both the short program and the free skate. In March 2017 Zabiiako/Enbert finished twelfth at the 2017 World Championships.

2017–18 season
Zabiiako/Enbert began their season on the Challenger Series, winning a gold medal at both the 2017 CS Lombardia Trophy and 2017 CS Ondrej Nepela Trophy.

In their first Grand Prix event of the season, Zabiiako/Enbert placed fourth at 2017 Skate Canada after placing fourth in both the short program and free skate. In their second Grand Prix event at 2017 Skate America, Zabiiako/Enbert placed fourth after ranking fourth in the short program and fifth in the free skate. The pair did not quality for the 2017-18 Grand Prix Final.

In December 2017, Zabiiako/Enbert won their 3rd 2017–18 Challenger Series gold medal when they won the 2017 CS Golden Spin of Zagreb. A few weeks later they placed third at the 2018 Russian Championships, earning places on the Russian national team for the 2018 Winter Olympics.

In January 2018, they won the bronze medal at the 2018 European Championships after placing second in the short program and third in the free skate.

At the Winter Olympics in Pyeongchang, South Korea, Zabiiako/Enbert placed third in the free skate portion of the team event, earning a silver medal as part of the Russian team.  They then placed seventh at the pairs event with a personal best score of 212.88 points.

In March 2018, Zabiiako/Enbert finished fourth at the 2018 World Championships after placing fourth in the short program and sixth in the free skate.

2018–19 season
Zabiiako/Enbert started their season in mid September at the 2018 CS Lombardia Trophy where they won the gold medal ahead of their teammates Aleksandra Boikova / Dmitrii Kozlovskii.

In early November, Zabiiako/Enbert won their first Grand Prix gold medal at the 2018 Grand Prix of Helsinki. They ranked second in the short program and first in the free skate and beat the silver medalists, Nicole Della Monica / Matteo Guarise, by about 13 points. Zabiiako described their first Grand Prix victory as "a good experience for us." Only one week later, Zabiiako/Enbert won their second Grand Prix gold medal at the 2018 NHK Trophy with a personal best score of 214.14 points. They ranked first in both programs and beat the silver medalist, Peng Cheng / Jin Yang, by about 7 points.

With two Grand Prix gold medals, they qualified for the 2018–19 Grand Prix Final. In second after the short program, an underrotated side-by-side jump from Zabiiako followed by an aborted lift toward the end of their program dropped them to fourth in the free skate and fourth overall. Zabiiako remarked that "probably some parts of our program were not quite ready yet, but we will improve them." At the 2019 Russian Championships, Zabiiako/Enbert won the silver medal, placing second in both the short and free programs.  Enbert said "we’re pleased with what we showed in the free skating. We fixed some issues from the Final and skated at a higher level here in Saransk."

Zabiiako/Enbert were named to Russia's team for the 2019 European Championships, but withdrew on December 27, 2018 due to medical issues.  They were replaced by Daria Pavliuchenko / Denis Khodykin.

One week prior to the 2019 World Championships, the skaters were declared fit to compete, and they won their first World medal—a bronze. They concluded their season at the 2019 World Team Trophy as part of Team Russia, where they won the bronze medal.

Retirement
Zabiiako/Enbert did not compete during the 2019–20 figure skating season due to Enbert's illness.  On February 26, 2020, it was announced that while Enbert was healthy again, they would not be returning to competition. 
In the same year, a documentary film "Unbroken" was released about two pair skating teams Cain-Gribble / LeDuc (USA) and Zabiiako / Enbert (Russia).

Attempt to resume a career in Canada
On May 18, 2022, it was announced that Zabiiako "is resuming her career and will compete for Canada" with Zachary Daleman as her partner under the guidance of a coach Bruno Marcotte. On July 20, 2022, it was announced that Zabiiako no longer trains in Canada and the request of the Canadian Figure Skating Federation was withdrawn.

Programs

With Enbert

With Larionov

With Zaboev

With Kulbach

With Muhhin

Records and achievements 
(with Enbert)

 Set the pairs' world record of the new +5 / -5 GOE (Grade of Execution) system for the short program (72.50 points) at the 2018 CS Lombardia Trophy.

Competitive highlights
GP: Grand Prix; CS: Challenger Series; JGP: Junior Grand Prix

With Enbert for Russia

With Larionov for Russia

With Zaboev for Estonia

With Kulbach for Estonia

With Muhhin for Estonia

Detailed results
Small medals for short and free programs awarded only at ISU Championships. At team events, medals awarded for team results only.

With Enbert

References

External links

! colspan="3" style="border-top: 5px solid #78FF78;" |World Record Holders

Estonian female pair skaters
Russian female pair skaters
World Figure Skating Championships medalists
European Figure Skating Championships medalists
1994 births
Living people
Figure skaters from Tallinn
Estonian LGBT people
Estonian people of Russian descent
Naturalised citizens of Russia
Estonian emigrants to Russia
Figure skaters at the 2018 Winter Olympics
Olympic figure skaters of Russia
Medalists at the 2018 Winter Olympics
Olympic medalists in figure skating
Olympic silver medalists for Olympic Athletes from Russia
LGBT figure skaters
Russian LGBT sportspeople